Baishnaba Pani (1882–1956) was an Indian writer and arranger of jatras, born at Kothapada, Mahanga, Cuttack; a type of folk-theatre in the state of Odisha. He introduced "gitinatya" (musical performance) for the first time in Odia jatra. Some of his popular jatra stories include "Saudagara Farce", "Abu Hussain Farce", and "'Natua Mohanty Farce".

Bibliography 
Gītināṭẏa, Gītābhinaẏa and Suāṅga
Raṅgasabhā gītināṭẏa 
Naḷadamaẏantī gītināṭẏa 
Rābaṇa badha gītināṭẏa 
Bakāsura badha gītināṭẏa 
Bakāsura badha gītināṭẏa 
Duryẏōdhana badha gītināṭẏa 
Brajalīḷā suāṅga 
Dhruba charita suāṅga 
Kīcakabadha suāṅga 
Dānabīra hariścandra suāṅga 
Sābitrī satẏabāna suāṅga 
Nikuñca miḷana suāṅga 
Pārbatī bibāha suāṅga 
Raghu arakṣita nābakēḷi suāṅga 
Muktācōri suāṅga 
Harapārbatī bibhā suāṅga 
Prahallāda carita gītābhinaẏa 
Dāṇḍiparba gītābhinaẏa 
Lakṣmī pūjā gītābhinaẏa 
Mahiṣāsura badha 
Sahasrā rābaṇa badha 
Bālẏalīḷā 
Subhadrā haraṇa 
Mādhaba sulōcanā 
Srībatsa rājā bā śani lakṣmī kaḷi 
Jarāsandha badha

References 

1882 births
1956 deaths
Indian writers
Writers from Odisha
Writers in British India